Trevor James Brewer (16 August 1930 – 15 July 2018) was a Welsh rugby union international player. He played for the Wales national rugby union team on three occasions, once in 1950 and twice in 1955.

Life and rugby career
Brewer, who was born in Newport, Wales and was educated at Newport High School, representing the school rugby team. He then represented his country at schoolboy level playing for the Welsh Secondary Schools team. He matriculated to Jesus College, Oxford where he studied chemistry.  He was called into the Wales national rugby union team for the match against England in January 1950 whilst still a student at Oxford, and before he had won his "Blue" (as he had missed the Varsity Match that year through injury). He played on the wing. Brewer did not play for Wales again until the 1954/1955 season, when he played in the matches against England and Scotland national rugby union team, scoring two tries against Scotland. He also played rugby for the Army, Newport RFC, London Welsh RFC (captaining the side) and the Welsh Academicals.

He later worked for ICI and lived in Northern Ireland. He was the father of Nicola Brewer, former British High Commissioner to South Africa and former chief executive of the Commission for Equality and Human Rights.

He died on 15 July 2018 at the age of 87.

References

1930 births
2018 deaths
Aldershot Services rugby union players
Alumni of Jesus College, Oxford
Wales international rugby union players
Welsh rugby union players
Rugby union wings
Newport RFC players
London Welsh RFC players
Oxford University RFC players
Rugby union players from Newport, Wales
Gloucester Rugby players
Sportspeople from Gloucestershire
People educated at Newport High School